Lee Hea-Kang (Hangul: 이혜강; born 28 March 1987) is a South Korean footballer who plays as defender.

Club career statistics

External links

1987 births
Living people
Association football defenders
South Korean footballers
Gyeongnam FC players
K League 1 players